Stephen Hodges is an educator who was President of Hult International Business School and also Chairman of the Hult Prize. He was President of Hult International Business School from 2006-2022. Under his leadership Hult grew into a leading global business school known for its innovation. Today, Hult has campuses around the world, over 5,000 degree students, over 6,000 executive students annually and is consistently ranked in the top 50 business schools in the world. In 2018 Hult became the only triple-accredited US business school.

Hodges has also served as a Commissioner with the New England Association of Schools and Colleges.

Education 
Hodges was born and educated in England. He received his master's degree from the University of Cambridge and his PhD from the University of Manchester. He completed two years of post-doctoral research in electronic engineering with AT&T Laboratories in Cambridge and is co-author of several patents related to data communication.

Career 
From 1998 to 2002, Hodges was an associate principal at McKinsey, and from 2002 to 2005 served as general manager of credit cards at Standard Chartered Bank in Hong Kong.

References 

Living people
Year of birth missing (living people)
Business school deans
Hult International Business School administrators
Hult International Business School faculty